Henry Bryant (1721-1799) was an English botanist.

Life
Bryant was born in Norwich, and educated privately in Norwich and at St John's College, Cambridge, where he graduated B.A. in 1749, and proceeded M.A. in 1753. He entered the church, but took up botany about 1764, after the death of his wife. He is said to have been a man of great acuteness and attainments in mathematics. From Norwich he was presented to the vicarage of Langham, Norfolk in 1758, removing afterwards to Heydon, Norfolk, and thence to the rectory of Colby, Norfolk, where he died on 4 June 1799. He was a brother of Charles Bryant, author of Flora diætetica, &c., who died shortly before him.

Works
 A particular Enquiry into the Cause of that Disease in Wheat commonly called Brand, Norwich, 1784, 8vo.

References

English botanists
English Christian religious leaders
1721 births
1799 deaths
English Anglicans
Alumni of St John's College, Cambridge
Scientists from Norwich
18th-century British botanists
18th-century English people